West River may refer to:

Rivers
Canada
West River (Antigonish, Nova Scotia) in Antigonish County, Nova Scotia
West River (Pictou, Nova Scotia) in Pictou County, Nova Scotia
West River (Halifax, Nova Scotia) in Sheet Harbour, Nova Scotia
West River (Annapolis, Nova Scotia) in Kejimkujik National Park
West River (Ontario), in Sudbury District

China
Xi River or West River, Guangdong
Changle River, formerly West River, Zhejiang

United States
West River (Connecticut)
Mattabesset River, Connecticut, formerly known as West River
West River (Maine)
West River (Maryland)
West River (Massachusetts)
West River (New York), a river in New York
West River (Rhode Island)
West River (South Dakota)
West River (Vermont)

Locations
Canada
West River, Ontario, an unincorporated place in Sudbury District
West River, Prince Edward Island, a community in Prince Edward Island
West River Station, Nova Scotia, a community in Pictou County

United States
West River (neighborhood), New Haven, Connecticut
West River, Maryland, a town
West River, Wyoming, a town
West River (South Dakota), a region name

See also
Western River (disambiguation)